Corymbia sphaerica, commonly known as the big-fruited bloodwood, is a species of tree, sometimes a mallee or shrub, that is endemic to a small area in the Northern Territory of Australia. It has rough bark on the trunk and branches, a crown of heart-shaped to lance-shaped juvenile leaves, flower buds in groups of three and shortened spherical fruit.

Description
It has rough, tessellated, brownish bark on the trunk and branches.

Taxonomy and naming
Corymbia sphaerica was first formally described in 1995 by Ken Hill and Lawrie Johnson in the journal Telopea from specimens collected in 1988 by Peter Latz, near Lake Surprise. The specific epithet (sphaerica) is from the latinised Greek sphaericus meaning "spherical", referring to the flower buds and fruit.

Distribution and habitat
Corymbia sphaerica grows in scrubland on red sandy soil on rises, and is found in the central Northern Territory from the eastern edge of the Tanami Desert to the Barrow Creek area. It occurs in the |Burt River, Davenport Murchison Ranges, Sturt Plateau and Tanami biogeographic regions bioregions.

Ecology
Following fire, this eucalypt is a facultative resprouter sending up epicormic sprouts from its lignotuber.

See also
List of Corymbia species

References

sphaerica
Myrtales of Australia
Flora of the Northern Territory
Plants described in 1995
Taxa named by Lawrence Alexander Sidney Johnson
Taxa named by Ken Hill (botanist)